David Gordon Ray, known professionally as David Ray, (born February 24, 1968) is a Canadian screenplay writer and film director from Montreal, Quebec, Canada.

Selected filmography 

 2005 - Fetching Cody - film
 2006 - Need for Speed: Carbon - video game
 2006 - A Safer Sex Trade - documentary
 2010 - Earth's Final Hours - television film
 2010 - Ice Quake - television film
 2010 - Mandrake - television film
 2011 - Seattle Superstorm - television film (in post-production)
 2011 - Mega Cyclone - television film (in post-production)
 2011 - Earth's Last Hours - television film
 2011 - The Sex Lives of Pirates - in pre-production
 2018 - Henchmen - film (writer)

External links 
 

1968 births
Canadian male screenwriters
Film directors from Montreal
Living people
Writers from Montreal
21st-century Canadian screenwriters
21st-century Canadian male writers